Andrew Shortridge (born April 26, 1995) is an American professional ice hockey goaltender. He is currently an unrestricted free agent. He has played with the San Jose Barracuda and the Stockton Heat in the American Hockey League (AHL). He was an All-American for Quinnipiac.

Playing career
Shortridge distinguished himself as a goaltending prospect at Eagle River High School as well as a local AAA organization. Before he graduated, Shortridge travelled south and began playing junior hockey in the Tier 1 Elite Hockey League. After aging out of the league, he continued his junior career for two seasons in two separate leagues. In 2016, Shortridge began attending Quinnipiac University and split the starting role with Air Force transfer Chris Truehl. Over the course of the season, Shortridge proved himself to be the better option in net and became the Bobcat's primary goaltender. After a slight decline as a sophomore, Shortridge was one of the top goaltenders in the nation as a junior; he led all qualifying goaltenders in both goals against average and save percentage and was named an All-American. He led Quinnipiac to a first-place finish in ECAC Hockey and though the team lost in the conference quarterfinals, the Bobcats' record was strong enough to earn them a bid into the NCAA Tournament.

After Quinnipiac was eliminated by eventual champion Minnesota Duluth, Shortridge signed a professional contract with the San Jose Sharks and was assigned to their AHL affiliate for the remainder of the year. For his first full season as a professional, Shortridge began in the AHL. After a less-than-stellar performance, however, he was demoted to the ECHL. While his numbers improved with the Allen Americans, Shortridge moved over to the Calgary Flames organization the following season. Despite his playing time being limited due to the COVID-19 pandemic, Shortridge played well enough to receive some playing time in the AHL.

Career statistics

Awards and honors

References

External links

1995 births
Living people
AHCA Division I men's ice hockey All-Americans
American men's ice hockey goaltenders
Ice hockey people from Alaska
Sportspeople from Anchorage, Alaska
Allen Americans players
Kansas City Mavericks players
Quinnipiac Bobcats men's ice hockey players
San Jose Barracuda players
Stockton Heat players
Vernon Vipers players